The Thudugala Ella (Sinhala: තුඩුගල ඇල්ල) waterfall is located in Thudugala village in Dodangoda Divisional Secretariat in Kalutara District of Western Province, Sri Lanka.  Out of around 382 recorded waterfalls in Sri Lanka, the rank of this is 268th.

Attraction
The fall, which has become a famous bathing place, is situated in an estate once owned by a British and his wrecked country house can still be seen there.  There is also a natural stream pool surrounded by “Ketala” plants and fern.  In the nearby forest reserve, there are many migratory birds and local birds, e.g. “pale bellied flower pecker”, the smallest bird in the country.

Another feature here is that a tunnel runs under the waterfall and comes out on top at one side of it.

Route
The route to the waterfall starts from Katukurunda Junction off the Galle Road;  from there on Matugama Road to Thudugala junction and from there  to the waterfall.

When travelling from Thudugala junction, visitors will come to another junction called "Ellagāwa (Near the waterfall) Junction" with a signboard of a rubber  plantation. From there, visitors to the waterfall and its natural bathing places will take the left road which runs over a small bridge nearby. The right road leads only to an artificial bathing place, which does not have a view of the Thudugala Ella waterfall.

Gallery

References

Waterfalls of Sri Lanka
Landforms of Kalutara District
Tourist attractions in Western Province, Sri Lanka